The women's rhythmic individual rope event took place on 14 October 2010, at the Indira Gandhi Arena in New Delhi, India as part of the 2010 Commonwealth Games.

Final

References
Results

Gymnastics at the 2010 Commonwealth Games
2010 in women's gymnastics